Steve Aponavicius (born August 10, 1986) is an American football kicker and the all-time leading scorer for Boston College's football program. A left-footed soccer convert, Aponavicius made his career debut against nationally ranked Virginia Tech on October 12, 2006 and successfully kicked two field goals and two extra points in the Eagles' 22–3 victory.

Early life and education
Aponavicius never played competitive football before arriving at Boston College. Growing up, Aponavicius played baseball and soccer at Easton Area High School in Easton, Pennsylvania, a city known for its high school football. He was an avid member of the "Rover Nation" student cheering section at Cottingham Stadium, where the Easton Red Rovers played football.

Boston College Eagles
As a freshman at Boston College in fall of 2005, Aponavicius began kicking field goals inside Alumni Stadium where he was spotted by Jay Civetti, a Graduate Assistant in the program. Civetti informed Aponavicius the team was currently looking for kickers and offered the special teams coach's contact information. After a brief one-kick tryout, Aponavicius began practicing with the team. His sophomore year, when starting placekicker Ryan Ohliger was suspended from the team for an incident at a local bar, Aponavicius was given the starting nod for a Thursday night matchup against Virginia Tech in front of a packed crowd of 44,500. Aponavicius' success as a walk-on kicker for Boston College gained him the nickname "Sid Vicious" and drew extensive press coverage and comparisons to the famed Notre Dame walk-on "Rudy."

He ended his dream-like season in 2006 with a game-winning 37-yard field goal to defeat Navy in the Meineke Car Care Bowl. Aponavicius finished the season as the team's leading point scorer, amassing 48 points. He was also named to the All-ACC Academic Team.

After receiving his undergraduate degree, Aponavicius enrolled in graduate school for his final year of eligibility. As a fifth-year senior, he became the all-time leading scorer in the history of the Boston College football program. At the time, Boston College coach Frank Spaziani said, "To drop out of the student body and come in here, and after a lot of hard work and a lot of time and energy, to become the all-time leading scorer – that's a great accomplishment that he can be very proud of. And we're very, very happy for him."

Personal life
Aponavicius is of Lithuanian ancestry.

References

External links
 Aponavicius' Boston College Athletics page
 Aponavicius' ESPN player card

1986 births
Living people
American football placekickers
Players of American football from Pennsylvania
Easton Area High School alumni
Boston College Eagles football players
American people of Lithuanian descent
Sportspeople from Easton, Pennsylvania